Bobby Lee Bell Sr. (born June 17, 1940) is an American former professional football player who played as an outside linebacker and defensive end for the Kansas City Chiefs. He is a member of the Pro Football Hall of Fame, the College Football Hall of Fame, and was a member of the Chiefs' team that won Super Bowl IV against the Minnesota Vikings.

High school career 
Bell excelled in several sports at a then-segregated Cleveland High School in Shelby, North Carolina. In his first two years of high school, he played six-man football, playing under center at the position of halfback. During his junior year, his school converted to playing as an 11-man team where Bell played quarterback. He would receive All-State honors in football. Bell claimed to be a better baseball player (7-19-21, KFAN Dan Barreiro show).

College career 
At the University of Minnesota, Bell was switched to the defensive line. He was a two-time All-American (1961 and 1962) and the winner of the 1962 Outland Trophy, which is given to the nation's most outstanding interior lineman. He also finished third in Heisman Trophy voting.  The Gophers with Bell were the 1960 National Champions, played in the 1961 Rose Bowl, and won the 1962 Rose Bowl. Bell was later inducted into the College Football Hall of Fame.

He joined Alpha Phi Alpha fraternity, via the Mu Chapter, while at the University of Minnesota.
At the age of 74, he completed his college degree at Minnesota by finishing the three remaining courses he required.  He graduated on May 14, 2015, some 50 years after leaving college to play professional football.

Professional football career
He played for the Kansas City Chiefs, first in the American Football League from 1963 through 1969, and then in the NFL from 1970 through 1974.  Bell was an AFL All-Star for six consecutive years, 1964 through 1969, and then an NFL Pro Bowler for three straight years (1970-1972).

He was on two AFL Championship teams and a World Championship team. He was named to the All-Time All-AFL Team in 1970. He was inducted into the Chiefs Hall of Fame in 1980, and the Pro Football Hall of Fame in 1983. The Chiefs retired his uniform number 78.  In 1999, he was ranked number 66 on The Sporting News''' list of the 100 Greatest Football Players.

One of Bell's finest moments came in the 1969 AFL divisional playoff game against the New York Jets. In a critical goal line stand, his key coverage on Jets running back Matt Snell stopped the drive and forced New York to kick a field goal. The 13–6 victory over the Jets propelled Kansas City to its first Super Bowl triumph. During a regular-season game against Denver (11/27), the Broncos, trailing 24–17 late in the game, attempted an onside kick that was recovered by Bell, who promptly returned that kick for a 53-yard touchdown.

Bell was noted for his one-of-a-kind athleticism at 6' 4" and 230 pounds and was reported to have run a 4.5 40-yard dash. Bell was possibly the most physically gifted linebacker in professional football history, for his speed at such a size made him ideal at outside linebacker. He was noted as one of the finest open-field tacklers in professional football history.

He was also a great blitzer from the linebacker position. Chiefs records show Bell had 40 career quarterback sacks and he might have had more if he had played right linebacker, not the left linebacker. In that era, more often than not the right-side linebacker got the call to "dog" or blitz since more often than not the tight end would be lined up right, on the defense's left. Bell scored 9 touchdowns in his career: 6 off interceptions (tied for most in NFL history for a linebacker with Derrick Brooks), 2 more touchdowns off fumble recoveries, and one off an onside kickoff return. Coach Hank Stram said that, "He could play all 22 positions on the field, and play them well." In addition to all that, he was regarded as one of the greatest long snapper centers for field goals and points-after-touchdowns in NCAA and AFL/NFL history.

After football
After his retirement, he opened Bobby Bell's Bar-b-que in Kansas City, Missouri.

On August 22, 2016, The Tournament of Roses announced Bobby Bell, Ricky Ervins, Tommy Prothro, and Art Spander would be inducted into the Rose Bowl Hall of Fame as the Class of 2016. The Rose Bowl Hall of Fame Induction Ceremony then took place on January 1, 2017, outside the Rose Bowl Stadium, one day before the kickoff of the 103rd Rose Bowl game on Monday, January 2, 2017.

See also
List of American Football League players

References

External linksPro Football Hall of Fame:'' Member profile
 

1940 births

Living people
African-American players of American football
All-American college football players
American football defensive ends
American football linebackers
Minnesota Golden Gophers football players
American Football League All-Star players
American Football League All-Time Team
Kansas City Chiefs players
American Conference Pro Bowl players
College Football Hall of Fame inductees
Pro Football Hall of Fame inductees
National Football League players with retired numbers
People from Shelby, North Carolina
Players of American football from North Carolina
American Football League players